Dogwood Creek is a stream in the Carroll County, Arkansas and Stone County, Missouri. It is a tributary of Little Indian Creek which enters Lake Taneycomo about one mile north of the confluence.

Dogwood Creek was so named on account of dogwood trees near its course.

See also
List of rivers of Arkansas
List of rivers of Missouri

References

Rivers of Stone County, Missouri
Rivers of Carroll County, Arkansas
Rivers of Arkansas
Rivers of Missouri